#1 to Infinity was a concert residency by American singer-songwriter Mariah Carey at The Colosseum at Caesars Palace in Las Vegas. It began on May 6, 2015, and concluded on July 18, 2017. The show featured all eighteen of Carey's US number-one singles in chronological order.

Background 
Carey announced the residency during her interview on The Ellen DeGeneres Show. The announcement follows reports that Canadian singer Celine Dion would not be returning to the venue who postponed her shows so that she could continue to take care of her ill husband. Later that spring 2015 Celine announced that she will return to Caesars Palace on August 27, 2015. Speaking of the residency, Carey said "I'm going to do my first ever residency in Vegas at Caesars. This is a special event for me. And again, I have to hope that the fans will enjoy this cause I'm gonna be performing, which was kind of inspired by my album #1's, and this is now the updated version with eighteen of them. I've never done this before." Tickets went on sale January 15, 2015.

Critical response 
Robin Leach from the Las Vegas Sun praised the opening performance, writing the singer "is the highest-pitched contemporary pop singer of the decade."

Set list 

 "Vision of Love"
 "Love Takes Time"
 "Someday" (with elements of "Ain't 2 Proud 2 Beg")
 "I Don't Wanna Cry"
 "Emotions"
 "I'll Be There" (with Trey Lorenz)
 "Dreamlover" (with elements from "Juicy")
 "Hero"
 "Fantasy" (Bad Boy Remix)
 "One Sweet Day" (with Daniel Moore and Trey Lorenz)
 "Always Be My Baby"
 "Honey" (Bad Boy Remix)
 "My All"
 "Heartbreaker" (Desert Storm Remix)
 "Thank God I Found You"
 "We Belong Together"
 "Don't Forget About Us"
 "Touch My Body"
 "Infinity"

Shows

Cancelled shows

Personnel 
 Show director — Ken Ehrlich
 Creative director — Raj Kapoor
 Musical director — James Wright
 Guitar — Tim Stewart
 Drums — Josh Baker
 Bass — Lance Tolbert
 Keyboards —  Daniel Moore & Derrieux Edgecombe
 Piano - James "Big Jim" Wright
 Backing vocalists — Trey Lorenz, Maryann Tatum, & Takeytha Johnson
 Choreographers — Tabitha and Napoleon D'umo
 Dancers — Bryan Tanaka, Shaun Walker, G. Madison IV, Joaquim de Santana, Anthony Burrell & Michael Silas

Notes

References 

2015 concert residencies
2016 concert residencies
2017 concert residencies
Concert residencies in the Las Vegas Valley
Mariah Carey concert residencies
Caesars Palace